Chekka Chivantha Vaanam is a 2018 Indian Tamil-language crime drama film directed by Mani Ratnam, co-written with Siva Ananth. Produced by Mani Ratnam under the banner Madras Talkies, along with Lyca Productions, the film features an ensemble cast including Arvind Swami, Arun Vijay, Silambarasan, Vijay Sethupathi, Thiagarajan, Prakash Raj, Jyothika, Jayasudha, Aditi Rao Hydari, Aishwarya Rajesh, Dayana Erappa, and Mansoor Ali Khan.

Chekka Chivantha Vaanam tells the story of three brothers who engage in a power struggle for control over their deceased father's criminal empire. The project was kick-started with A. R. Rahman and Santhosh Sivan as the music composer and the cinematographer, respectively. The team spent nearly six months for choosing the cast and crew, respectively, with subsequent changes. Principal photography of the film commenced in February 2018 and filming continuously took place on Chennai, Abu Dhabi, Dubai and Serbia until that June. The soundtrack and background score was composed by A. R. Rahman, while Santosh Sivan handled the cinematography and Sreekar Prasad edited the film.

Chekka Chivantha Vaanam was released on 27 September 2018 to positive reception from critics and audiences, praising the direction and performances of the cast, but criticising it for lacking strong women characters. Chekka Chivantha Vaanam won two awards at the Ananda Vikatan Cinema Awards, and one award each at the Behindwoods Gold Medal Film Festival, and Norway Tamil Film Festival Awards, while it was nominated for the 8th South Indian International Movie Awards.

Plot 
Senapathi is a 60 year-old billionaire in Chennai, god-fearing boss of a powerful crime family, and benami of multiple politicians. While on the way back from a temple with his wife, Lakshmi, to celebrate their wedding anniversary, assassins disguised as policemen, attempt to kill Senapathi and Lakshmi, despite being escorted by heavily armed men. However, they escape the assault with minor injuries. Senapathi's children – a daughter and three sons – are notified of this. 

The eldest son, Varadharajan, runs the bigger part of his crime empire, based in Chennai. He is married to Chitra and has 3 children. The second, Thyagarajan aka Thyagu, operates his hawala business in Dubai with Arabs, laundering his father's income. He is married to Renu and has 2 children. The third, Ethirajan aka Ethi, runs the independent Serbian section of Senapathi's weapons empire. He is engaged to Chaaya. Senapathi's daughter, Priya, is married to an industrialist, based in Coimbatore. Thyagu, Ethi and a heavily pregnant Priya, return home, after hearing about the attack on their parents. 

Meanwhile, Varadan tries contacting his childhood friend, Inspector Rasool Ibrahim, for information behind the ambush on Senapathi. Rasool has been recently suspended on a human rights violation, by beating a young boy during an investigation, for a case. Soon, after his arrival and meeting up with Varadan, they discuss the attack and about the potential mastermind behind it, with Chinnappadasan, a longtime rival of Senapathi, being the most probable. Although Chinnappadasan denies being the one behind the attack, Varadan kills Chinnappa's son-in-law, creating a gang war by sending a person to shoot Thyagu in the lawn, men to shoot Ethi and Rasool, during a casual football match with his friends, on the beach, and some of his henchmen to shoot Varadhan, which they all miss. 

At the same time, Senapathi regains health, and Priya delivers a boy. During their meetup with Chinnappadasan at the new baby's naming function, Senapathi tells him that he is aware of who the culprit is, and makes peace. Senapathi reveals to Lakshmi that one of their sons is behind this. Thyagu and his family leave for Dubai, while Ethi returns to Serbia, for his wedding with Chaaya. Soon after, Senapathi dies from a sudden stroke, and the brothers start a power struggle over who will be the next "king to the throne". A feud begins between them, after Varadan takes control of his father's domestic empire. Further, he conspires against his brothers, by harming their wives and hiring men to kill them. Chaaya is killed by a sniper while honeymooning with Ethi. Renuka is arrested on false charges and imprisoned for life in Dubai. 

Ethi and Thyagu join hands to seek vengeance against Varadan, on the condition that, Thyagu will be the sole king over the whole empire. They try to get back to India, via Nepal, but are captured by Varadan's men at the airport. Ethi and Thyagu thrash the men and inform Varadan, before escaping and reaching Chennai. They overpower Varadan, by manipulating his henchmen, promising them higher wages and a better life, overall. They kill their maternal uncle Chezhiyan, who is Varadan's father-in-law (Chitra's father), and capture Varadan's lover, Parvathi. Ethi manages to bribe Rasool into working for them. Fearing that his brothers may harm his family, Varadan sends his family away to Coimbatore and flees from Chennai, with Chitra. 

During a night shootout in Andhra Pradesh, Chitra is shot. In the hospital, before she dies, Varadan reveals to her that he hired the assassins to kill Senapathi, so that he could succeed in getting his father's place and take over the empire. Ethi and Thyagu catch Varadan with Rasool's help. In the midst of the confrontation, Thyagu kills Varadan, for framing and incarcerating Renuka. Subsequently, Ethi kills Thyagu, for hiring an assassin to kill Chaaya, after Thyagu revealed that he only did that to create a "spark". Ethi tries to lure Rasool at gunpoint, by offering to either "bite the dust or join him". Rasool stalls Ethi, by narrating how his father, a gangster, was gunned and killed at the Chennai airport, before him and his mother. 

Fearing for his life, Rasool's mother sent him to live with his uncle and aunt, before committing suicide. These events filled him with hatred of all gangsters and criminals, and became a cop, as a result. He also reveals to Ethi, that he is actually working undercover, to eliminate Senapathi's empire, and the rift between the brothers created a chance for him to bring down their empire of crime, once and for all. Rasool then proceeds to shoot and kill Ethi, before reporting to his superiors, that Operation Red Sky has been accomplished.

Cast

Production

Development 
Following a brief break after the release of Kaatru Veliyidai (2017), Mani Ratnam chose to begin pre-production on his next film by June 2017 and brought in composer A. R. Rahman and cinematographer Santosh Sivan for the project.
In an interview given to Sudhir Srinivasan, Mani Ratnam revealed that Mughal emperor Aurangzeb's battle for the throne was the inspiration for the film.

Cast and crew 
In July 2017, reports in the media suggested that Mani Ratnam's next film would feature four male characters, and actors Vijay Sethupathi, Arvind Swami, Fahadh Faasil and Dulquer Salmaan were in negotiations to play various roles. While the first three actors eventually accepted to work on the film, discussions with Dulquer fell through. Silambarasan later signed the film in early September 2017, and an official announcement from the production studio confirmed the four lead actors were attached to the project. Telugu actor Nani had also held discussions with Mani Ratnam for a role in the film, but was later not included in the final cast. Prior to the beginning of the shoot, Silambarasan undertook a weight loss regime to get into shape for his character. In the months leading up to the start of the shoot, there was speculation in the media that Silambarasan would be banned from the project after allegations were made by producer Michael Rayappan about the actor's deliberate lack of co-operation during the making of Anbanavan Asaradhavan Adangadhavan (2017). Despite protests from other film producers, Mani Ratnam chose to retain Silambarasan in the film. In a media interaction during January 2018, Vijay Sethupathi confirmed that he would portray a full-length role, denying reports which suggested that he had a cameo appearance. Fahadh later opted out due to scheduling conflicts with other projects, and was later replaced by Arun Vijay.

Jyothika agreed to portray a leading female role in early September 2017, and confirmed her participation to the media while promoting Magalir Mattum (2017). She had earlier appeared in Mani Ratnam's production venture Dumm Dumm Dumm (2001), but stated her excitement at being selected in a film to be directed by him.  Likewise, Aishwarya Rajesh also revealed her presence in the project during early September 2017, and expressed her delight working with Mani Ratnam. In late January 2018, Aditi Rao Hydari, who had appeared as the lead actress of Mani Ratnam's previous project Kaatru Veliyidai (2017), was also confirmed to be a part of the cast. Model Dayana Erappa also later joined the cast to play the fourth leading actress, marking her first acting assignment. She was cast after two rounds of auditions and then prepared for her role by attending workshops led by theater actors in Mumbai.

For a supporting role, actress Jayasudha agreed to work on the film in November 2017, while Prakash Raj joined the cast during the following month to portray her husband. The production house revealed that actors Thiagarajan and Mansoor Ali Khan were also added to the cast before filming started. Furthermore, other supporting actors including Cheenu Mohan and Malayalam actor Antony Varghese were reported to have signed to play characters in the film, though Varghese was later replaced by Appani Sarath. Chennai-based radio jockey Sindhu also debuted as an actress, during the first schedule. Siva Ananth was credited as the co-writer, while Bejoy Nambiar worked as one of the creative producers. Dhilip Subbarayan was signed to choreograph the stunt sequences, while Sharmishta Roy and Eka Lakhani were signed as the production designer and costume designer, respectively.

Filming 
In late January 2018, prior to the start of the shoot, Lyca Productions agreed to purchase the rights of the film on a "first copy" basis and release it worldwide. Three days prior to the start of the shoot in February 2018, the film's title was announced as Chekka Chivantha Vaanam in Tamil, and as Nawab for the dubbed Telugu version. Principal photography began on 12 February 2018 on the outskirts of Chennai, with scenes shot on the East Coast Road and at the Apollo Hospital in Vanagaram during the first schedule. A second schedule began on 26 February 2018, with all members of the cast intermittently featuring in the shoot. As the second schedule progressed, cinematographer Santosh Sivan released images of the various actors on the sets of the film. The shoot continued in Chennai until mid-March, with a wedding scene, also shot, before being halted as a result of a film industry-wide production strike announced by the Tamil Film Producers Council, who were campaigning against extortionate rates employed by digital service providers.

Following the strike, production resumed in Chennai on 25 April 2018, with scenes involving Vijay Sethupathi being shot near Kovalam Beach in Chennai. Media reports emerged suggesting that the production team had carelessly littered areas of the beach during the making of the film, making it dangerous for public use, but Executive Producer Siva Ananth refuted the allegations. In May 2018, the team travelled to Abu Dhabi and Dubai to shoot scenes involving Arun Vijay and Aishwarya Rajesh, as a part of three week schedule. The final schedule featuring Silambarasan and Dayana Erappa was completed over a week in Serbia and principal photography was subsequently wrapped up on 2 June 2018.

Music 

A. R. Rahman began composing on the film on a recce to Goa on early February 2018, with Mani Ratnam and lyricist Vairamuthu. The album was released on 5 September 2018 by Sony Music, and Rahman gave a live performance of the songs.

Release 
The official first look poster of the film was released on 9 February 2018, revealing the title and main cast of this project. Mani Ratnam launched the first look in Tamil and dubbed Telugu, on his official Twitter handle. On 3 August 2018, a poster was released on the Twitter handle of Lyca Productions, revealing that the film will release on 28 September 2018. On 12–15 August 2018, The team launched a set of 4 posters, revealing the four main characters of the film, before another poster which released on 17 August 2018. The team released another set of 4 posters, featuring the female characters on 20–23 August 2018.

The official theatrical trailer of the movie was released on 25 August 2018, on the YouTube channel of Lyca Productions, receiving rave reviews upon release. On 12 September 2018, the makers announced that the film along with its dubbed Telugu version Nawab, will release on 27 September 2018, as the release date was advanced by one day. Following this, the second trailer of the movie was released on 21 September 2018, which also received positive reviews.

The satellite rights of the movie were acquired by STAR Vijay, and its television premiere took place on 13 January 2019.

Reception

Critical response 
Behindwoods gave the film a rating of 3 out of 5 stars, saying that, "CCV is a worthy family gangster drama in true Mani Ratnam style with massy fan moments." Indiaglitz referred the movie as a mesmerising gangster saga, and rated the film 3.5 out of 5. The Times of India gave the film 3.5 out of 5 stars and summarized that, "The single-mindedness of the script, which doesn't stray away from its two major concerns is actually the film’s strength." Scroll.in called it a subtle yet clever tribute to Akira Kurosawa's Ran . A critic from India Today rated 4 out of 5 stars, summarising that "Throughout, the film pretends to be a hunt for that one bad guy among the heroes. But in the end, you realise how wrong you were." Deccan Chronicle, rated the film 3 out of 5 stars and noted, "CCV is a revenge drama that would leave you captivated and spellbound." The Indian Express, rated 3 out of 5 stars for the film and summarised that "Chekka Chivantha Vaanam feels like the work of a fresh director with an impressive understanding about the craft of filmmaking. It could be because auteur Mani Ratnam has made a violent film after a very long time. It could also be because it is a straightforward movie, in which he has highly favored words to images." Sreedhar Pillai from Firstpost rated 3.5 out of 5, and commented that "Mani Ratnam's direction triumphs in a story-driven crime thriller". News18 rated the film with 4 out 5 stars, and summarised that "Ratnam's Chekka Chivantha Vaanam, which is undeniably his best work of this decade, is a slow-burning, highly rewarding story of a crime-ridden family that gets torn apart by power, greed and deceit." S. Shivakumar of The Hindu noted the similarities with the 2013 South Korean movie New World and called it "the closest Mani Ratnam has come to plagiarism".

Box office 
During the first four days of the film's release, it grossed ₹300 million (US$4 million) gross in Tamil Nadu alone, taking one of the largest openings recorded in the region. The film did well in international markets, including the United States, the United Kingdom, Australia and the New Zealand. Within two days of release, the film had made A$170,682 (US$121,512) in Australia, £63,895 (US$82,690) in the UK, NZ$54,411 (US$35.530) in New Zealand and $592,319 in the US.

Awards and nominations

References

External links 
 

Films directed by Mani Ratnam
2010s Tamil-language films
Films scored by A. R. Rahman
2018 films
Films shot in Serbia
Films shot in Abu Dhabi
Films shot in Dubai
Fictional portrayals of the Tamil Nadu Police
Films set in Dubai
Films set in Serbia
Films set in Chennai
Indian gangster films
Films set in Nepal
Films set in Puducherry
2010s police procedural films
Films shot in Chennai
Patricide in fiction
Fratricide in fiction
2018 action drama films
2018 crime drama films
Indian crime drama films
Indian action drama films
Films about organised crime in India
Films set in Andhra Pradesh